The Catholic Church in South Korea (called Cheonjugyo, Hangul: 천주교; Hanja: 天主教; literally, "Religion of the Lord of Heaven") is part of the worldwide Catholic Church, under the spiritual leadership of the Pope in Rome. At the end of 2017, it had 5,813,770 members (11.0% of the population) with 5,360 priests and 1,734 parishes.

History
Spanish Jesuit priest Gregorio Céspedes was possibly the first Catholic missionary in Korea, said to have arrived in Busan on 27 December 1593. At the time of the Japanese invasions of Korea (1592–98), Japanese leader Konishi Yukinaga married a Korean Christian woman, who had adopted Julia as her name. Macau received an influx of African slaves, Japanese slaves as well as Christian Korean slaves who were bought by the Portuguese from the Japanese after they were taken prisoner during the Japanese invasions of Korea (1592–98) in the era of Hideyoshi. 

However, Catholicism (and Christianity in general) in Korea more generally began in 1784 when Yi Seung-hun was baptized while in China under the Christian name of Peter. He later returned to Korea carrying religious texts, and baptized many fellow countrymen. The Church in Korea continued without formal missionary priests until a Chinese priest, Zhōu Wénmó arrived in 1794.

During the 19th century, the Catholic Church was targeted by the government of the Joseon Dynasty chiefly for the religion's opposition to ancestral "worship", which the Church perceived to be a form of idolatry, but which the State prescribed as a cornerstone of Korean culture.

Despite a century-long persecution that produced thousands of martyrs – 103 of whom were canonized by Pope John Paul II in May 1984, including the first Korean priest, St. Andrew Taegon Kim, who was ordained in 1845 and martyred in 1846 – the Church in Korea expanded. The Apostolic Vicariate of Korea was formed in 1831, and after the expansion of the Church structure over the next century, the current structure of the three Metropolitan Provinces, each with an Archdiocese and several suffragan Dioceses, was established in 1962.

In 1899, "the Sinch'uk Rebellion, a Confucian-led and -organised popular uprising", made a "most barbarous massacre" of from 500 to 600 victims. It was in reaction to promises of tax exemptions by lay-assistants and desecration of "spirit-shrines" by Catholics, after the arrival of two French priests to Cheju.

Current status
Government surveys showed that more than 45% of South Koreans practice no religion, that about 22% are Buddhists, and that 29.2% are Christians with 11.1% being Catholics and 18% being Protestants, meaning that Christianity is the largest religion.

The Catholic Church in South Korea has seen significant growth in recent years, increasing its membership by from 7.9% of the population to 11% over the past twenty years. At the end of 2017 there were 5,813,770 Catholics in South Korea – 11.0% of the population. In 2017, the Church grew by 1.3%, with over 75,000 adult baptisms. Part of this growth can be attributed to the Church's relatively positive perception by the general public because of its role in the democratization of South Korea, its active participation in various works of social welfare, and its respectful approach to interfaith relationship and matters of traditional Korean spirituality.

There are 15 dioceses including three archdioceses – Seoul, Daegu, and Gwangju – and a military ordinariate.

In North Korea under the communist regime, Christianity is officially suppressed, and unofficial estimates by South Korean Church officials place the number of Catholics there at only 5,000. The North Korean Catholic Church, ecclesiastically united with South Korea, is composed of the two dioceses of Diocese of Pyongyang and Diocese of Hamhung (suffragan to the Metropolitan Archbishop of Seoul), and the only territorial abbey outside Europe, the Territorial Abbey of Tokwon or Dokwon.

South Korea (and by extension the Catholic Church in all Korea, north and south) has the fourth largest number of saints in the Catholic Church since 1984 as categorized by nation, a number which includes the Korean Martyrs.

Pope Francis' visit
Pope Francis accepted an invitation to visit South Korea in August 2014. The four-day visit (14–18 August) culminated with a Papal Mass at Myeongdong Cathedral, the seat of the Archdiocese of Seoul on 18 August. During a mass on 16 August, the Pope beatified 124 Korean Catholic martyrs. An invitation for North Korea's Catholics to attend was declined, due to South Korea's refusal to withdraw from military exercises which it had planned with the United States.

Dioceses and archdioceses
South Korea has fifteen territorial dioceses (three archdioceses and twelve dioceses) and one military diocese:

Province of Seoul
 Archdiocese of Seoul ; 서울대교구
 Diocese of Incheon ; 인천교구
 Diocese of Suwon ; 수원교구
 Diocese of Uijeongbu ; 의정부교구
 Diocese of Chunchon ; 춘천교구
 Diocese of Wonju ; 원주교구
 Diocese of Daejeon ; 대전교구

Province of Daegu
 Archdiocese of Daegu ; 대구대교구
 Diocese of Pusan ; 부산교구
 Diocese of Andong ; 안동교구
 Diocese of Masan ; 마산교구
 Diocese of Cheongju ; 청주교구

Province of Gwangju
 Archdiocese of Gwangju ; 광주대교구
 Diocese of Jeonju ; 전주교구
 Diocese of Jeju ; 제주교구

Other
 Military Ordinariate of South Korea ; 군종교구

Inculturation
Catholicism in South Korea is unique in that it has inculturated with traditional Confucian customs that form an integral part of traditional secular Korean culture. As a result, South Korean Catholics continue to practice ancestral rites and observe many Confucian customs and philosophies.

See also
 Catholic Bishops' Conference of Korea
 Korean Catholic Bible
 Korean Martyrs
 List of Saints from Asia
 Christianity in Korea
 Seohak
 Catholic Persecution of 1801

References

Further reading
  The Founding of Catholic Tradition in Korea
  The Origin of the Roman Catholic Church in Korea: An Examination of Popular and Governmental Responses Catholic Missions in the Late Chosôn Dynasty

External links
  백과사전 "Catholicism" entry in Naver Encyclopedia Dictionary
 "Sŏhak" entry in Encyclopædia Britannica
 History of the Asian Missions - Introduction of Catholicism into Korea

 
South Korea
Religious syncretism in Asia